Gregory Edwin Latta (October 13, 1952 – September 28, 1994) was an American football player. As tight end, he was drafted by the Baltimore Colts of the National Football League (NFL), but played instead for the Florida Blazers of the World Football League (WFL) in 1974. He was traded to the Chicago Bears in 1975 for third- and seventh-round draft picks, along with the head coach of the Blazers, Jack Pardee. Latta was a member of the Bears from 1975 to 1979.

In his rookie season with the Florida Blazers, Latta caught 39 passes for 815 yards and nine touchdown receptions. The Blazers went to the 1974 World Bowl Championship game falling 22-21 to the Birmingham Americans.
 
During his 5-year NFL career, the 6-foot-3, 227-pound tight end caught 90 passes for 1,081 yards and 7 touchdowns. On special teams, he returned 3 kickoffs for 22 yards.

Background
Latta attended South Side High School in Newark and Morgan State College in Baltimore, Maryland.

Death 
He died on September 28, 1994 at St. Michael's Hospital of an apparent heart attack, Newark, New Jersey.  He was 41 years old.

References 

1952 births
1994 deaths
Sportspeople from Philadelphia
Sportspeople from Newark, New Jersey
Players of American football from New Jersey
Players of American football from Philadelphia
American football tight ends
Malcolm X Shabazz High School alumni
Morgan State Bears football players
Chicago Bears players
Florida Blazers players